Sort is the capital of the comarca of Pallars Sobirà, in the province of Lleida, Catalonia, in the country of Spain. It is located at 692 metres above the sea, by the river Noguera Pallaresa, a tributary to the Segre. Population 2,113 (2005).

It was once capital of the County of Pallars.

The word sort is Catalan for "luck". The Sort-based lottery shop La Bruixa d'Or ("The Gold Witch") has taken advantage of the town's name to promote itself both within Spain (attracting business from around the country) and over the Internet. They claim to have a disproportionate number of lottery winners.

The municipality includes the small village of Olp.

References

External links
Pallars Sobirà Official website 
Pallars Sobirà Tourism
 Government data pages 

Municipalities in Pallars Sobirà